Cryptoconchus is a genus of chitons in the family Acanthochitonidae.

Species 
 Cryptoconchus porosus - the butterfly chiton
 Cryptoconchus floridanus - the white-barred chiton

Extinct species 
The genus is also represented in the fossil record, in Pliocene and Pleistocene rocks.

References

 
 Powell A W B, New Zealand Mollusca, William Collins Publishers Ltd, Auckland, New Zealand 1979 

Acanthochitonidae
Extant Pliocene first appearances